Toi et moi meaning You and Me may refer to:

Films and television
Toi et moi (film), 2006 French film by Julie Lopes-Curval

Music
Toi + Moi, an album by French singer Grégoire
"Toi + Moi" (song), title track from Grégoire's Toi + Moi album
Toi et moi, a 1994 album by Charles Aznavour
"Toi et moi" (Charles Aznavour song), title track from Charles Aznavour's album Toi et moi
"Toi et Moi" (Namie Amuro song)
"Toi & moi", a song by Lorie from her 2005 album Best of
"Toi et moi", song by Colonel Reyel from his album 2012 album Soldat de l'amour
"Toi et moi", single from Guillaume Grand album L'amour est laid
"Toi et moi", song by French group Tryo, from their album Ce que l'on sème